Transport in Eritrea includes highways, airports and seaports, in addition to various forms of public and private vehicular, maritime and aerial transportation.

Railways 

The railway links Agordat and Asmara with the port of Massawa; however, it was nonoperational since 1978 except for about a 5 kilometre stretch that was reopened in Massawa in 1994. Rehabilitation of the remainder and of the rolling stock has occurred in recent years. By 2003, the line had been restored from Massawa all the way through to Asmara.

There are no rail links with adjacent countries.

Highways 

The Eritrean highway system is named according to the road classification. The three levels of classification are: primary (P), secondary (S), and tertiary (T). The lowest level road is tertiary and serves local interests. Typically they are improved earth roads which are occasionally paved. During the wet seasons these roads typically become impassable. The next higher level road is a secondary road and typically is a single-layered asphalt road that connects district capitals together and those to the regional capitals. Roads that are considered primary roads are those that are fully asphalted (throughout their entire length) and in general they carry traffic between all the major towns in Eritrea. 

total:
4,010 km
paved:
874 km
unpaved:
3,136 km (1996 est.)

Seaports and harbours

Red Sea 
 Asseb (Aseb)
 Massawa (Mits'iwa)

Merchant marine 
total:
ships by type:
bulk carrier 1, cargo ship 1, liquefied gas 1, petroleum tanker 1, roll-on/roll-off ship 1 (1999 est.)

Airports 
There are three international airports, one in the capital, Asmara International Airport, and the two others in the coastal cities, Massawa (Massawa International Airport) and Assab (Assab International Airport). The airport in Asmara received all international flights into the country as of March 2007, as well as being the main airport for domestic flights. 

21 (1999 est.)

Airports - with paved runways

Airports - with unpaved runways 
total:
18
over 3,047 m:
2
2,438 to 3,047 m:
2
1,524 to 2,437 m:
6
914 to 1,523 m:
6
under 914 m:
2 (1999 est.)

Cableway
The Asmara-Massawa Cableway, built by Italy in the 1930s, connected the port of Massawa with the city of Asmara.  The British later dismantled it during their eleven-year occupation after defeating Italy in World War II.

References

See also

 Eritrea